Marcel Heller (born 12 February 1986) is a German footballer who plays as a winger for SV Straelen.

Career

Early career
In 2006, Heller signed with Regionalliga Süd club Sportfreunde Siegen for its 2006–07 campaign, joining from the Alemannia Aachen reserves. He immediately earned a regular spot and drew attraction in a DFB-Pokal match against Eintracht Frankfurt.

Eintracht Frankfurt and loan
Eintracht Frankfurt signed Heller in November 2006. He debuted for the eagles coming on as a substitute on 27 January 2007 against Schalke 04. He scored his first Bundesliga goal in an away fixture at Bielefeld on 14 April 2007.

In the 2007–08 campaign, Heller had many injury problems and played only four matches for the first team.

In August 2008, a season long loan deal was confirmed with MSV Duisburg who had been relegated to the 2. Bundesliga.

After the loan, Heller stayed with Eintracht Frankfurt for another two seasons.

Dynamo Dresden
Heller signed with Dynamo Dresden for the 2011–12 season who had earned promotion to the 2. Bundesliga the previous season.

Alemannia Aachen
In 2012, Heller joined Alemannia Aachen in the 3. Liga on a two-year deal which was terminated after the first season due to Aachen getting relegated.

Darmstadt 98
After the termination of his contract, he signed within the league for SV Darmstadt 98. With The Lilies Heller managed to go through 2 consecutive promotions ending up in the Bundesliga.

FC Augsburg
In June 2017, Heller signed with FC Augsburg on a free transfer agreeing to a two-year contract.

Return to Darmstadt 98
On 28 July 2018, Darmstadt 98 announced that Heller would return to the club on a two-year contract.

References

External links
 
 
 Profile at kicker Online

1986 births
Living people
German footballers
Association football wingers
Bonner SC players
Alemannia Aachen players
Sportfreunde Siegen players
Eintracht Frankfurt players
Eintracht Frankfurt II players
MSV Duisburg players
Dynamo Dresden players
SV Darmstadt 98 players
FC Augsburg players
SC Paderborn 07 players
FSV Frankfurt players
SV 19 Straelen players
Germany under-21 international footballers
Bundesliga players
2. Bundesliga players
3. Liga players
Regionalliga players
People from Frechen
Sportspeople from Cologne (region)
Footballers from North Rhine-Westphalia